Izoria may refer to:

People
 Levan Izoria (born 1974), Georgian minister 
 Nikoloz Izoria (born 1985), Georgian boxer 
 Zviad Izoria (born 1984), Georgian chess grandmaster

Places
 Izoria, Álava, a village in Ayala/Aiara municipality, Álava province, Spain

See also
 Izora (disambiguation)
 Izhorians

Georgian-language surnames